Amasing Hill consists of three small andesitic volcanoes. The volcanic complex is located on Bacan island at the west of Halmahera island, Indonesia. The two volcanoes, Cakasuanggi and Dua Saudara, were constructed in the southeast. The other volcano, Sibela Mountains, is a metamorphic complex of volcano.

See also 

 List of volcanoes in Indonesia

References 

Stratovolcanoes of Indonesia
Mountains of Indonesia
Holocene stratovolcanoes